Ian Riccaboni (born January 13, 1987) is an American sportscaster and author, currently signed to Ring of Honor.

Personal life
Riccaboni was born January 13, 1987, in Allentown, Pennsylvania. He graduated from Salisbury High School in Salisbury Township, Pennsylvania, in 2005. He graduated from New York University (NYU) in May 2009 with a bachelor's degree in media and communications and in May 2010 with a master's degree in education management from the University of Pennsylvania.

Riccaboni first appeared on television when he was cast in a 1996 KidsPeace commercial featuring former Major League Baseball pitcher Jim Kaat. Riccaboni spent his early summers as a batboy for the Allentown Ambassadors of the independent Northern League. A fan of professional wrestling from a young age, Riccaboni's mother would take him to professional events put on by World Wrestling Federation (WWF), World Championship Wrestling (WCW), and Extreme Championship Wrestling (ECW) in his native Allentown.

During his first year at NYU, Riccaboni answered a casting call to be a part of a special to air on MTV called The Notorious BG, hosted by Gideon Yago with special guest Bill Gates. In early 2006, Riccaboni was cast for an MTVU commercial for their Best Music on Campus competition, competing on guitar, harmonica, and vocals. While at NYU, Riccaboni played baseball and was a Dean's Scholar, playing gigs around New York and NYU, including a gig opening for the cast of Spring Awakening at an NYU event in Gould Plaza. Riccaboni graduated NYU as the Class of 2009 president and received the President's Service Award.  
After graduating NYU in May 2009, Riccaboni pursued and completed a master's degree from Penn in education management. During his time at Penn, he returned to television, playing bass guitar as lead singer for the house band on "Hump Night with Kris Fried" on Service Electric TV 2.

Riccaboni has been married since October 6, 2012, to his wife Sarah. He resides in Salisbury Township, Pennsylvania in the Lehigh Valley region of eastern Pennsylvania.

Broadcasting career

Phillies Nation TV (2012–2015)
Riccaboni began writing as a full-time contributor to USA Today-award-winning blog Phillies Nation in November 2011.
In 2012, Phillies Nation began producing Phillies Nation TV and Riccaboni began appearing on the show, interviewing minor leaguers and Philadelphia Phillies fans, including Marc Summers and Tony Luke. In 2014, Riccaboni conducted a four-part interview with Curt Simmons for the show and in 2015 interviewed Brad Lidge and Bobby Shantz.
In association with Phillies Nation, Riccaboni released a book, "The 100 Greatest Phillies of All Time" on September 15, 2015.

Ring of Honor (2014–present)

Riccaboni began his professional wrestling announcing career after a chance meeting with The Blue Meanie, Brian Hefron. Riccaboni was to interview Hefron as part of his beat interviewing famous Philadelphia Phillies fans. The two were searching for a location, and Hefron suggested The Monster Factory in Paulsboro, New Jersey. While filming the segment, Riccaboni met Monster Factory owner Danny Cage. Riccaboni phoned Cage about getting started in professional wrestling after the completion of the segment before beginning to work with the Monster Factory as an interviewer and commentator.

Through a camp with Ring of Honor (ROH) broadcaster Kevin Kelly and wrestler Bob Evans, Riccaboni discovered and asked to attend an ROH tryout camp. Riccaboni started as a personality with Ring of Honor at Future of Honor 2 in July 2014. Riccaboni called his first match with Ring of Honor on Saturday January 3, 2015, which featured Cheeseburger and Chris LeRusso.

In May 2015, Riccaboni made his debut as a ring announcer with Ring of Honor, announcing the first match at Global Wars '15's television taping. Riccaboni served as an in-arena host for Ring of Honor live events and a commentator for Future of Honor and Women of Honor matches before assuming the role of lead announcer starting with the February 25, 2017, episode.

Riccaboni called his first Pay Per View with ROH at ROH 15th Anniversary Show alongside Kelly and Colt Cabana. He and Cabana hold the distinction of being the first duo to ever call a Minoru Suzuki match on American soil when they did so at the Death Before Dishonor XV Pay Per View event.

In 2018, Riccaboni was commentator for the ALL IN broadcast with Don Callis, Sean Mooney, Excalibur, Alicia Atout, Justin Roberts, and Bobby Cruise Riccaboni served as the lead play-by-play announcer with Excalibur, Callis, and others joining throughout the night. On December 15, 2018, Riccaboni and Cabana were presented with the 2018 Broadcast Team of the Year Award by veteran wrestling writer, photographer, and editor Bill Apter.

On April 6, 2019, Riccaboni, Kelly, and Cabana called G1 Supercard, the first non-WWE wrestling event in Madison Square Garden since 1960.

On December 23, 2019, RetroSoft Studios announced Riccaboni and Cabana would be providing commentary for the sequel to the 1991 arcade game WWF WrestleFest, RetroMania Wrestling, on PlayStation 4, Nintendo Switch, Xbox One, and PC.

Riccaboni represented Ring of Honor at Impact Wrestling's Hard To Kill (2022) calling the ROH World Championship bout between Jonathan Gresham and Chris Sabin. Riccaboni became the first commentator to appear on both a ROH Pay Per View and an Impact Pay Per View and did so within 28 days between Hard to Kill and Final Battle (2021).

New Japan Pro-Wrestling (2022–present) 

On a Lehigh Valley with Love broadcast, Riccaboni announced he was still under contract with ROH but would begin on a tryout basis with New Japan Pro-Wrestling’s NJPW Strong on their January tapings in Seattle. It was reported in August 2022 that Riccaboni would be continuing with New Japan as the voice of Strong through at least the remainder of 2022.

All Elite Wrestling (2022–present) 
Following Tony Khan's purchase of Ring of Honor, Riccaboni would appear commentate during Ring of Honor matches on All Elite Wrestling, notably on April 29, 2022, during Samoa Joe's victory over Trent Beretta on Rampage.

Riccaboni became the target of Chris Jericho and the Jericho Appreciation Society following Jericho's ROH World Championship victory over Claudio Castagnoli at AEW Grand Slam (2022). Riccaboni would call all of Jericho's World Title defenses, including Jericho's defense at Full Gear (2022), making Riccaboni the first-ever to call Pay Per View bouts for ROH, Impact, GCW, NJPW, and AEW, doing so all in the same calendar year.

Community involvement

Riccaboni was a member of the Upper Dublin Historical Commission and teaches at Holy Family University in Philadelphia. As a writer with Phillies Nation, Riccaboni worked to coordinate Wiffadelphia, Quizzo, and wrestling events events that raised food and money for Philabundance and Food Bank of South Jersey.

With ROH, Riccaboni has led the ROH Cares initiative to encourage ROH wrestlers, crew, and staff to improve the communities they are in as well as the ones that host ROH events. In 2017, Riccaboni and Cabana partnered with Rocky Romero, Bobby Cruise, and Cody Rhodes to raise $1550 across two nights to support victims of Hurricane Irma and Hurricane Maria. In 2019, Riccaboni and ROH ambassador Cary Silkin represented ROH at a WXW-C4 event co-promoted by WWE and coordinated by Lance Anoa'i to benefit Samu (wrestler). Following Final Battle (2019), Riccaboni and Caprice Coleman conducted a book drive for the United Way and WLVT-TV's Lehigh Valley Reads organization and the pair raised 526 books to donate.

Riccaboni has been involved in multiple efforts to raise money for LGBTQ causes. In 2019, ROH offered a redesigned Pride Edition of the t-shirt featuring his signature sign-off "Happy Wrestling" with the Pride Flag with proceeds going to the Bradbury-Sullivan LGBT community center in his hometown of Allentown. In 2020, Pro Wrestling Tees and ROH released a MicroBrawler in Riccaboni's likeness with the proceeds once again being donated to Bradbury-Sullivan. In 2021, Riccaboni and Bradbury-Sullivan partnered with Cameo on a campaign to once again raise money for the center in his hometown.

References

External links
 

1987 births
Living people
American sports announcers
Professional wrestling announcers
Salisbury High School (Pennsylvania) alumni
Sportspeople from Allentown, Pennsylvania
Steinhardt School of Culture, Education, and Human Development alumni
University of Pennsylvania Graduate School of Education alumni